General elections were held in Haiti on 22 September 1957. Former Minister of Labour François Duvalier won the presidential election running under the National Unity Party banner, defeating Louis Déjoie, as well as independent moderate Clement Jumelle, who had dropped out on election day in a cloud of suspicions that the army was monitoring the election in favour of Duvalier. Former head of state Daniel Fignolé, considered a champion of poor blacks, was considered ineligible as he had been forcibly exiled months before the election, allegedly kidnapped.

Supporters of Duvalier also won the Chamber of Deputies elections. Following the election, Déjoie went into exile in Cuba along with his supporters, fearing repression from Duvalier's supporters. Haiti was not to see a free or semi-free election until after the fall of Duvalier's son Jean-Claude Duvalier in February 1986.

Voters cut the nail of the little finger of the left hand and dipped it in indelible ink to mark that the person voted.

Results

President

Chamber of Deputies

References

Elections in Haiti
Haiti
General
Presidential elections in Haiti
Election and referendum articles with incomplete results